A. A. Karuppasamy (born 1 July 1964) is an Indian politician and was a member of the 14th Tamil Nadu Legislative Assembly from the Avinashi constituency, which is reserved for candidates from the Scheduled Castes. He represented the All India Anna Dravida Munnetra Kazhagam party.

Karuppasamy was born on 1 July 1964 in Alathur. He is married and has three children.

References 

1964 births
Tamil Nadu MLAs 2011–2016
All India Anna Dravida Munnetra Kazhagam politicians
Living people
People from Thanjavur district